Jett Noland (born November 12, 2003) is an American professional racing driver who last competed part-time for Niece Motorsports in both the NASCAR Camping World Truck Series, driving the Nos. 44 and 45 Chevrolet Silverados, and the ARCA Menards Series, driving the No. 50 Chevrolet SS. He has also competed in Stadium Super Trucks, super late model racing, and the Trans-Am Series.

Racing career
Noland's racing career started in go-kart racing before later moving up to Pro Trucks.

In May 2017, Noland and the team his parents own, Next Level Motorsports, signed with Cape Motorsports to start a driver development program for Noland, including races in go-karts, Legends cars and an appearance in the Formula 4 United States Championship.

In November 2018, Noland's parents created Hype Motorsports Group for Noland to co-pilot a Honda TCR entry in the 2019 Michelin Pilot Challenge with Victor Gonzalez Jr., who had previously served as Noland's driver coach in CARS Super Late Model Tour competition. During the course of the season, however, Noland did not enter any Pilot Challenge TCR races.

In 2019, Noland raced super late models at New Smyrna Speedway and the Southern Super Series, winning SLM Rookie of the Year at New Smyrna.

To start off his 2020 season, Noland won the Pro Late Model portion of the RedEye 50/50 at New Smyrna on January 5, 2020. On February 6, it was announced that Noland would join Niece Motorsports to make his NASCAR Truck Series in the team's No. 44 truck in six races: Richmond, Iowa, Gateway, Bristol, Martinsville and Phoenix. However, due to financial problems after the COVID-19 pandemic, Noland would not run any of those races for Niece in 2020 and would not make his Truck Series debut until 2021. On February 8, Noland won the pro late model feature for that night of the World Series of Asphalt after incidents with Jamie Skinner and Connor Mosack, leaving both unhappy with Noland. A night later at the same track, Skinner wrecked Noland out of another pro late model race and was later parked for rough driving due to the incident. 

In August 2020, Noland made his Stadium Super Trucks debut at Road America; he had been at the track to compete in the Trans-Am Series' TA2 class. Noland also continued to race SLMs for team owners Mike Cope and Anthony Campi in the summer of 2020.

Noland rejoined Niece in February 2021 for a six-race Truck Series schedule beginning with the BrakeBest Select 159 on Daytona International Speedway's infield road course. He also returned to the Stadium Super Trucks at the Grand Prix of St. Petersburg in April.

Motorsports career results

NASCAR
(key) (Bold – Pole position awarded by qualifying time. Italics – Pole position earned by points standings or practice time. * – Most laps led.)

Camping World Truck Series

ARCA Menards Series
(key) (Bold – Pole position awarded by qualifying time. Italics – Pole position earned by points standings or practice time. * – Most laps led.)

K&N Pro Series East

Stadium Super Trucks
(key) (Bold – Pole position. Italics – Fastest qualifier. * – Most laps led.)

 Season still in progress
 Ineligible for series points
 Standings were not recorded by the series for the 2020 season

References

External links
 

Living people
2003 births
NASCAR drivers
Racing drivers from Florida
People from Groveland, Florida
CARS Tour drivers
Stadium Super Trucks drivers
Trans-Am Series drivers